Laura Richards may refer to:
 Laura E. Richards, American writer
 Laura Richards (advocate), British criminal behavioral analyst

See also
 Laura Richards House, Gardiner, Maine
 Laura Richardson, American politician
 Laura Anning Bell, British artist, born Laura Richard